Morro is a settlement in the west of the island of Maio in Cape Verde. It is located 5 km north of the island capital Porto Inglês and 6 km south of Calheta. As of the 2010 census, its population was 310. The beach north of the village, Praia do Morro, is a 6.66 km2 nature reserve.

See also
List of villages and settlements in Cape Verde

References

Villages and settlements in Maio, Cape Verde
Beaches of Cape Verde
Protected areas of Cape Verde